Landmark Peak is a very prominent peak,  high, standing  south of Minnesota Glacier on the east side of Gowan Glacier, in the Heritage Range, Antarctica. It was named by the University of Minnesota Geological Party to these mountains in 1963–64 because the peak is a well used reference point for pilots flying in the area.

See also
 Mountains in Antarctica

References

Mountains of Ellsworth Land